Jonathan Rowland Shaw (born 3 June 1966) is a British Labour Party politician who served as the Member of Parliament for Chatham and Aylesford from 1997 to 2010. He also served in the Government as the Minister for Disabled People from 2008 to 2010. He is currently the CEO of Policy Connect.

Early life
Shaw was educated at Vinters Boys' School, West Kent College and Bromley College.

Parliamentary career
A former member of Rochester-upon-Medway City Council, Shaw was first elected to the House of Commons at the 1997 general election; which resulted in a nationwide landslide for the Labour Party. He was re-elected in 2001, with a majority of 4,340 votes and again in 2005; with a reduced majority of 2,332 votes.

Shaw served as Parliamentary Private Secretary to Ruth Kelly as Secretary of State for Education and Skills in 2005–06. He was also an Assistant Government Whip in 2006–07, prior to joining The Department for Environment, Food and Rural Affairs as Minister for Fisheries.

Shaw served as a member of the Commons Environmental Audit Select Committee (1997–2001), and the Education and Skills Select Committee (2001–05). In July 2007, Shaw was appointed Minister for the South East of England.

Following a Cabinet reshuffle in October 2008, Shaw was moved to the DWP, becoming a Parliamentary Under-Secretary of State for Work and Pensions, and Minister for Disabled People, replacing Anne McGuire, while retaining his position as Minister for the South East.

Shaw lost his seat at the 2010 general election to Tracey Crouch of the Conservative Party. On the BBC Politics Show South East in July 2010, he said that he had withdrawn from public life. Shaw is now the Chief Executive of Policy Connect,  an independent, cross-party not-for-profit social enterprise with two decades in policy work.

Personal life 
While an MP, Shaw lived in Snodland in his constituency.

Notes

References

External links
Archived website
Jonathan Shaw profile - Department for Work and Pensions
Guardian Unlimited Politics - Ask Aristotle: Jonathan Shaw MP
TheyWorkForYou.com - Jonathan Shaw MP

|-

1966 births
Living people
Labour Party (UK) MPs for English constituencies
People from Snodland
Councillors in Kent
UK MPs 1997–2001
UK MPs 2001–2005
UK MPs 2005–2010
People from Chatham, Kent